Two ships of the United States Navy have borne the name USS Glennon, in honor of Rear Admiral James H. Glennon.

, was a  launched in 1945 and struck in 1976

United States Navy ship names